De Witte is a Dutch and Flemish surname.

'De Witte]] may also refer to:
, a celebrated 1920 novel by Ernest Claes
De Witte (film), a 1934 Belgian film based upon the novel
Whitey (film) (AKA De Witte van Sichem''), a 1980 Belgian film based on the novel
De Witte (restaurant), a former Dutch restaurant with a Michelin star

See also